Edward Howe Forbush (April 24, 1858 – March 7, 1929) was a noted Massachusetts ornithologist and a prolific writer, best known for his book Birds of New England.

Biography

Born in Quincy, Massachusetts, in 1858, he was a precocious naturalist. His family moved to West Roxbury, when he was seven. As an older child, he conducted field studies of area wildlife and also studied taxidermy. Once again, his family moved to Worcester, where he became a member of the Worcester Natural History Society, and began to publish the results of his studies. At the age of sixteen he was appointed Curator of Ornithology of the Society's museum.

When he was nineteen, he mounted an expedition to Florida — this would be the first of many trips he took around the United States to study birds.

In 1893, Forbush was appointed Ornithologist to the Massachusetts State Board of Agriculture. His primary studies at this time were "economic ornithology" — that is, determining whether a given species of bird was beneficial or detrimental to agriculture.

In 1908 he became the Massachusetts State Ornithologist.

He was a founder of the Massachusetts Audubon Society. He was also first president of the Northeastern Bird-Banding Association (now the Association of Field Ornithologists).

His work "Birds of Massachusetts (and Other New England States)" is a three-volume set of books published 1925–1929 by the Massachusetts Department of Agriculture. Title notwithstanding, it was and remains a valuable reference regarding not just New England birds but also in regard to ornithology of the Northeast and farther afield.

He was also known for his studies of the Heath Hen and his attempts to save the species.

He died in Westborough in 1929. His wife donated a glass case containing artistically arranged ornithological specimens to the Westborough Public Library, with a plaque reading:  "Presented by Etta L. Forbush in memory of her husband Edward Howe Forbush. All specimens collected prepared and mounted by Mr. Forbush at the age of eighteen."  In 1931, The Forbush Bird Club of Worcester, Mass., was established in his memory.

Selected publications

Useful Birds and their Protection (1907)
Rats and Rat Riddance (1915)
A History of the Game birds, Wild Fowl and Shore Birds of Massachusetts and Adjacent States (1916)
The Domestic Cat (1916)
Birds of Massachusetts and Other New England States (1925)

Notes

References
Forbush, Edward Howe, 1925–1929, The Birds of Massachusetts (and Other New England States). 3 vol. Massachusetts Department of Agriculture
May, Dr. John B., "Edward Howe Forbush" in Bulletin of the Northeastern Bird Banding Association, Vol.4, no. 2, April 1928
May, Dr. John B., "Edward Howe Forbush: 1858-1929" in Bulletin of the Northeastern Bird Banding Association, Vol. 5, no. 2, April 1929
White, E.B. "Mr. Forbush's Friends," in The New Yorker, February 26, 1966, pp. 42–66.

External links

Forbush Bird Club

1858 births
1929 deaths
American nature writers
American ornithologists
People from West Roxbury, Boston
Writers from Quincy, Massachusetts
Writers from Worcester, Massachusetts